The Reject Shop Limited is an Australian discount variety store chain selling a range of goods such as food, snacks, gift cards and party, health and beauty aids, cleaning supplies, storage, kitchenware, homewares and seasonal items in 356 store locations across Australia.

Founded in 1979, The Reject Shop employs over 5,000 staff. The group replaced a number of Chickenfeed stores in Tasmania, and took up the space that was left when Retail Adventures closed down.

History
The first store opened in South Yarra, Melbourne in 1981. This shop sold seconds and discontinued lines, hence The Reject Shop name. 

In 1994, the chain became majority owned by Macquarie Bank. It was floated on the Australian Securities Exchange in June 2004. The float was successful, with the company tripling in size two years after going public.

Former chief executive Barry Saunders, recruited to the company in 2000 by Macquarie Bank, retired in 2007. He was replaced in May 2007 by Gerry Masters, a former Coles Group executive, after 33 years with his former employer.

On 11 September 2009, it was announced that Gerry Masters had resigned his position as managing director and would be replaced by Chris Bryce, the chief financial officer, effective 14 September 2009.

Despite the strong growth experienced by the company in the years following 2004, a profit warning in December 2010 resulted in a sharp drop in the share price. The company was also affected by the Queensland Floods of 2010, with the company's Ipswich Distribution Centre being flooded. The warehouse became operational once again on 28 August 2011. A similar profit warning in June 2014 resulted in another share drop of 50%, making them one of the top worst performing shares in 2014.

In 2013, the company commenced an aggressive growth plan, following the closure of a number of Retail Adventures stores. The company passed the 300 store milestone in October 2013.

On 8 July 2014, The Reject Shop announced the appointment of Ross Sudano (formerly of Little World Beverages) as chief executive officer. His appointment follows the departure of Chris Bryce in June 2014, after leading a significant growth phase of the business.

In December 2019, the company announced Andre Reich as chief executive officer, effective from 13 January 2020. For the financial year ending 30 June 2020, The Reject Shop posted increased sales of over AUD$820m.

On 2 September 2020 the company in Australia announced a partnership with British supermarket chain Tesco. In October they launched a lowest price guarantee 

In November 2020, The Reject Shop launched a partnership with DoorDash.

See also
Red Dot
Homeart
Target Australia
Best & Less

References

External links
 

1979 establishments in Australia
Companies based in Melbourne
Companies listed on the Australian Securities Exchange
Discount stores of Australia
Retail companies established in 1979
Retail companies of Australia
Variety stores
Shops in Australia